Aubourn with Haddington or Aubourn and Haddington is a civil parish in the North Kesteven district of Lincolnshire, England. The population of the civil parish at the 2011 census was 460.

The parish includes the villages of Aubourn and Haddington. The two villages are on opposite banks of the River Witham.

The parish was formed when the parish of Aubourn Haddington and South Hykeham was dissolved in 1991 to become two separate parishes: Aubourn with Haddington, and South Hykeham.

See also
South Hykeham

References

External links

Civil parishes in Lincolnshire
North Kesteven District